{{DISPLAYTITLE:C24H40O4}}

The molecular formula C24H40O4 (molar mass: 392.57 g/mol, exact mass: 392.29266) may refer to:
 Chenodeoxycholic acid, a bile acid
 Deoxycholic acid, a bile acid
 Hyodeoxycholic acid, a bile acid
 Ursodiol, a bile acid